The BMP file format or bitmap, is a raster graphics image file format used to store bitmap digital images, independently of the display device (such as a graphics adapter), especially on Microsoft Windows and OS/2 operating systems.

The BMP file format is capable of storing two-dimensional digital images in various color depths, and optionally with data compression, alpha channels, and color profiles. The Windows Metafile (WMF) specification covers the BMP file format.

Device-independent bitmaps and the BMP file format 

Microsoft has defined a particular representation of color bitmaps of different color depths, as an aid to exchanging bitmaps between devices and applications with a variety of internal representations.  They called these device-independent bitmaps or DIBs, and the file format for them is called DIB file format or BMP image file format.

According to Microsoft support: A device-independent bitmap (DIB) is a format used to define device-independent bitmaps in various color resolutions. The main purpose of DIBs is to allow bitmaps to be moved from one device to another (hence, the device-independent part of the name). A DIB is an external format, in contrast to a device-dependent bitmap, which appears in the system as a bitmap object (created by an application...). A DIB is normally transported in metafiles (usually using the StretchDIBits() function), BMP files, and the Clipboard ( data format).

The following sections discuss the data stored in the BMP file or DIB in detail. This is the standard BMP file format. Some applications create bitmap image files which are not compliant with the Microsoft documentation. Also, not all fields are used; a value of 0 will be found in these unused fields.

File structure 
The bitmap image file consists of fixed-size structures (headers) as well as variable-sized structures appearing in a predetermined sequence. Many different versions of some of these structures can appear in the file, due to the long evolution of this file format.

Referring to the diagram 1, the bitmap file is composed of structures in the following order:

DIBs in memory 
A bitmap image file loaded into memory becomes a DIB data structure – an important component of the Windows GDI API. The in-memory DIB data structure is almost the same as the BMP file format, but it does not contain the 14-byte bitmap file header and begins with the DIB header.  For DIBs loaded in memory, the color table can also consist of 16-bit entries that constitute indexes to the currently realized palette (an additional level of indirection), instead of explicit RGB color definitions.  In all cases, the pixel array must begin at a memory address that is a multiple of 4 bytes. In non-packed DIBs loaded in memory, the optional color profile data should be located immediately after the color table and before the gap1 and pixel array (unlike in diag. 1).

When the size of gap1 and gap2 is zero, the in-memory DIB data structure is customarily referred to as "packed DIB" and can be referred to by a single pointer pointing to the beginning of the DIB header.  In all cases, the pixel array must begin at a memory address that is a multiple of 4 bytes. In some cases it may be necessary to adjust the number of entries in the color table in order to force the memory address of the pixel array to a multiple of 4 bytes.  For "packed DIBs" loaded in memory, the optional color profile data should immediately follow the pixel array, as depicted in diag. 1 (with gap1=0 and gap2=0).  "Packed DIBs" are required by Windows clipboard API functions as well as by some Windows patterned brush and resource functions.

Bitmap file header 
This block of bytes is at the start of the file and is used to identify the file. A typical application reads this block first to ensure that the file is actually a BMP file and that it is not damaged. The first 2 bytes of the BMP file format are the character "B" then the character "M" in ASCII encoding.  All of the integer values are stored in little-endian format (i.e. least-significant byte first).

DIB header (bitmap information header) 
This block of bytes tells the application detailed information about the image, which will be used to display the image on the screen. The block also matches the header used internally by Windows and OS/2 and has several different variants. All of them contain a dword (32-bit) field, specifying their size, so that an application can easily determine which header is used in the image. The reason that there are different headers is that Microsoft extended the DIB format several times. The new extended headers can be used with some GDI functions instead of the older ones, providing more functionality. Since the GDI supports a function for loading bitmap files, typical Windows applications use that functionality. One consequence of this is that for such applications, the BMP formats that they support match the formats supported by the Windows version being run. See the table below for more information.

The Windows 2.x BITMAPCOREHEADER differs from the OS/2 1.x BITMAPCOREHEADER (shown in the table above) in the one detail that the image width and height fields are signed integers, not unsigned.

Versions after  only add fields to the end of the header of the previous version. 

An integrated alpha channel has been introduced with the undocumented  and with the documented  (since Windows 95) and is used within Windows XP logon and theme system as well as Microsoft Office (since v2000); it is supported by some image editing software, such as Adobe Photoshop since version 7 and Adobe Flash since version MX 2004 (then known as Macromedia Flash). It is also supported by GIMP, Google Chrome, Microsoft PowerPoint and Microsoft Word.

For compatibility reasons, most applications use the older DIB headers for saving files. With OS/2 no longer supported after Windows 2000, for now the common Windows format is the  header. See next table for its description. All values are stored as unsigned integers, unless explicitly noted.

The compression method (offset 30) can be:

An OS/2 2.x  ( in IBM's documentation) contains 24 additional bytes:

The halftoning algorithm (offset 60) can be:

Color table 
The color table (palette) occurs in the BMP image file directly after the BMP file header, the DIB header, and after the optional three or four bitmasks if the  header with BI_BITFIELDS (12 bytes) or BI_ALPHABITFIELDS (16 bytes) option is used. Therefore, its offset is the size of the  plus the size of the DIB header (plus optional 12-16 bytes for the three or four bit masks).
Note: On Windows CE the  header can be used with the BI_ALPHABITFIELDS option in the biCompression member.

The number of entries in the palette is either 2n (where n is the number of bits per pixel) or a smaller number specified in the header (in the OS/2  header format, only the full-size palette is supported). In most cases, each entry in the color table occupies 4 bytes, in the order blue, green, red, 0x00 (see below for exceptions).

The color table is a block of bytes (a table) listing the colors used by the image.  Each pixel in an indexed color image is described by a number of bits (1, 4, or 8) which is an index of a single color described by this table. The purpose of the color palette in indexed color bitmaps is to inform the application about the actual color that each of these index values corresponds to.  The purpose of the color table in non-indexed (non-palettized) bitmaps is to list the colors used by the bitmap for the purposes of optimization on devices with limited color display capability and to facilitate future conversion to different pixel formats and palettization.

The colors in the color table are usually specified in the 4-byte per entry RGBA32 format. The color table used with the OS/2  uses the 3-byte per entry RGB24 format.  For DIBs loaded in memory, the color table can optionally consist of 2-byte entries – these entries constitute indexes to the currently realized palette instead of explicit RGB color definitions.

However, some versions of Microsoft's documentation disallow this feature by stating that the RGBQUAD.rgbReserved member "must be zero".

As mentioned above, the color table is normally not used when the pixels are in the 16-bit per pixel (16bpp) format (and higher); there are normally no color table entries in those bitmap image files.  However, the Microsoft documentation (on the MSDN web site as of Nov. 16, 2010) specifies that for 16bpp (and higher), the color table can be present to store a list of colors intended for optimization on devices with limited color display capability, while it also specifies, that in such cases, no indexed palette entries are present in this Color Table.  This may seem like a contradiction if no distinction is made between the mandatory palette entries and the optional color list.

Pixel storage 
The bits representing the bitmap pixels are packed in rows(also known as strides or scan lines).  The size of each row is rounded up to a multiple of 4 bytes (a 32-bit DWORD) by padding.

For images with height above 1, multiple padded rows are stored consecutively, forming a Pixel Array.

The total number of bytes necessary to store one row of pixels can be calculated as:

The total number of bytes necessary to store an array of pixels in an n bits per pixel (bpp) image, with 2n colors,  can be calculated by accounting for the effect of rounding up the size of each row to a multiple of 4 bytes, as follows:

Pixel array (bitmap data) 
The pixel array is a block of 32-bit DWORDs, that describes the image pixel by pixel. Usually pixels are stored "bottom-up", starting in the lower left corner, going from left to right, and then row by row from the bottom to the top of the image. Unless  is used, uncompressed Windows bitmaps also can be stored from the top to bottom, when the Image Height value is negative.

In the original OS/2 DIB, the only four legal values of color depth were 1, 4, 8, and 24 bits per pixel (bpp). 
Contemporary DIB Headers allow pixel formats with 1, 2, 4, 8, 16, 24 and 32 bits per pixel (bpp). GDI+ also permits 64 bits per pixel.

Padding bytes (not necessarily 0) must be appended to the end of the rows in order to bring up the length of the rows to a multiple of four bytes. When the pixel array is loaded into memory, each row must begin at a memory address that is a multiple of 4.  This address/offset restriction is mandatory only for Pixel Arrays loaded in memory. For file storage purposes, only the size of each row must be a multiple of 4 bytes while the file offset can be arbitrary. A 24-bit bitmap with Width=1, would have 3 bytes of data per row (blue, green, red) and 1 byte of padding, while Width=2 would have 6 bytes of data and 2 bytes of padding, Width=3 would have 9 bytes of data and 3 bytes of padding, and Width=4 would have 12 bytes of data and no padding.

Compression 
 Indexed color images may be compressed with 4-bit or 8-bit RLE or Huffman 1D algorithm.
 OS/2 2 24bpp images may be compressed with the 24-bit RLE algorithm.
 The 16bpp and 32bpp images are always stored uncompressed.
 Note that images in all color depths can be stored without compression if so desired.

Pixel format 

 The 1-bit per pixel (1bpp) format supports 2 distinct colors, (for example: black and white). The pixel values are stored in each bit, with the first (left-most) pixel in the most-significant bit of the first byte. Each bit is an index into a table of 2 colors. An unset bit will refer to the first color table entry, and a set bit will refer to the last (second) color table entry.
 The 2-bit per pixel (2bpp) format supports 4 distinct colors and stores 4 pixels per 1 byte, the left-most pixel being in the two most significant bits (Windows CE only:).  Each pixel value is a 2-bit index into a table of up to 4 colors.
 The 4-bit per pixel (4bpp) format supports 16 distinct colors and stores 2 pixels per 1 byte, the left-most pixel being in the more significant nibble.  Each pixel value is a 4-bit index into a table of up to 16 colors.
 The 8-bit per pixel (8bpp) format supports 256 distinct colors and stores 1 pixel per 1 byte.  Each byte is an index into a table of up to 256 colors.
 The 16-bit per pixel (16bpp) format supports 65536 distinct colors and stores 1 pixel per 2-byte WORD. Each WORD can define the alpha, red, green and blue samples of the pixel.
 The 24-bit per pixel (24bpp) format supports 16,777,216 distinct colors and stores 1 pixel value per 3 bytes.  Each pixel value defines the red, green and blue samples of the pixel (8.8.8.0.0 in RGBAX notation). Specifically, in the order: blue, green and red (8 bits per each sample).
 The 32-bit per pixel (32bpp) format supports 4,294,967,296 distinct colors and stores 1 pixel per 4-byte DWORD. Each DWORD can define the alpha, red, green and blue samples of the pixel.

In order to resolve the ambiguity of which bits define which samples, the DIB headers provide certain defaults as well as specific BITFIELDS, which are bit masks that define the membership of particular group of bits in a pixel to a particular channel. The following diagram defines this mechanism:

The sample fields defined by the BITFIELDS bit masks have to be contiguous and non-overlapping, but the order of the sample fields is arbitrary. The most ubiquitous field order is: Alpha, Blue, Green, Red (MSB to LSB). The red, green and blue bit masks are valid only when the Compression member of the DIB header is set to BI_BITFIELDS. The alpha bit mask is valid whenever it is present in the DIB header or when the Compression member of the DIB header is set to BI_ALPHABITFIELDS (Windows CE only).

RGB video subtypes 
The BITFIELD mechanism described above allows for the definition of tens of thousands different pixel formats, however only several of them are used in practice, all palettized formats RGB8, RGB4, and RGB1 (marked in yellow in the table above, defined in dshow.h.MEDIASUBTYPE names):

In version 2.1.4 FFmpeg supported (in its own terminology) the BMP pixel formats bgra, bgr24, rgb565le, rgb555le, rgb444le, rgb8, bgr8, rgb4_byte, bgr4_byte, gray, pal8, and monob; i.e., bgra was the only supported pixel format with transparency.

Example 1 

Following is an example of a 2×2 pixel, 24-bit bitmap (Windows DIB header ) with pixel format RGB24.

Example 2 
Following is an example of a 4×2 pixel, 32-bit bitmap with opacity values in the alpha channel (Windows DIB Header ) with pixel format ARGB32.

Note that the bitmap data starts with the lower left hand corner of the image.

Usage of BMP format 
The simplicity of the BMP file format, and its widespread familiarity in Windows and elsewhere, as well as the fact that this format is relatively well documented and has an open format, makes BMP a very common format that image processing programs from many operating systems can read and write. ICO and CUR files contain bitmaps starting with a BITMAPINFOHEADER.

Many older graphical user interfaces used bitmaps in their built-in graphics subsystems; for example, the Microsoft Windows and OS/2 platforms' GDI subsystem, where the specific format used is the Windows and OS/2 bitmap file format, usually named with the file extension of .BMP.

While most BMP files have a relatively large file size due to lack of any compression (or generally low-ratio run-length encoding on palletized images), many BMP files can be considerably compressed with lossless data compression algorithms such as ZIP because they contain redundant data. Some formats, such as RAR, even include routines specifically targeted at efficient compression of such data.

Related formats 

The X Window System uses a similar XBM format for black-and-white images, and XPM (pixelmap) for color images. There are also a variety of "raw" formats, which save raw data with no other information. The Portable Pixmap (PPM) and Truevision TGA formats also exist, but are less often used – or only for special purposes; for example, TGA can contain transparency information.

References

External links 
 Bitmap File Structure, at digicamsoft.com
 An introduction to DIBs (Device Independent Bitmaps), at herdsoft.com

 A simple bitmap loader C++ class, at kalytta.com (A2R10G10B10 not  supported)
 The BMP File Format, Part 1 By David Charlap at Dr. Dobb's journal of software tools (drdobbs.com), March 1995

Raster graphics file formats
Microsoft Windows multimedia technology